Sir Lancelot was a knight of the Round Table.

Sir Lancelot may also refer to:

Sir Lancelot (singer) (1902–2001), calypso singer and actor
RFA Sir Lancelot (L3029), a Round Table class landing ship
Sir Lancelot (video game), a 1984 computer game published by Melbourne House for the Amstrad CPC and ZX Spectrum
Sir Lancelot (clipper), a clipper ship built in 1865